James MacGeoghegan (1702 at Uisneach, Westmeath, Ireland – 1763 at Paris) was an Irish Roman Catholic priest and historian, known in French as the Abbé Mac-Geoghegan.

Life
He came of the Geoghegan family long settled in Westmeath and long holding a high position among the Leinster chiefs, and was related to Richard MacGeoghegan, who defended the Castle of Dunboy against Carew, and also to Connell MacGeoghegan, who translated the Annals of Clonmacnoise, as well as to Francis O'Molloy, author of the Lucerna Fidelium.

MacGeoghegan went abroad, and received a Catholic education at the Lombard College (later the Irish College, Paris), and in due course was ordained priest. Then for five years he filled the position of vicar in the parish of Possy, in the Diocese of Chartres, "attending in choir, hearing confessions and administering sacraments in a laudable and edifying manner". 

In 1734, he was elected one of the provisors of the Lombard College, and subsequently was attached to the Church of Saint-Merri in Paris. He was also for some time chaplain to the Irish Brigade in the service of France.

Works
He wrote a History of Ireland in French, published at Paris from 1758. It was dedicated by the author to the Irish Brigade, and claims that during the fifty years following the Treaty of Limerick (1691) no fewer than 450,000 Irish soldiers died in the service of France. MacGeoghegan was shut out from access to the manuscript materials of history in Ireland, and had to rely chiefly on John Lynch and John Colgan. John Mitchel's 1869 History of Ireland professes to be merely a continuation of MacGeoghegan, though Mitchel is throughout much more of a partisan than MacGeoghegan.

Bibliography

References

Attribution

Sources

Citations

Further reading
 

University of Paris alumni
1702 births
1763 deaths
18th-century Irish Roman Catholic priests
18th-century Irish historians
Irish emigrants to France
People from County Westmeath